Don Hill is an American politician and retired pharmacist who served as a member of the member of the Kansas House of Representatives for the 60th district from 2003 to 2017.

Early life and education 
Hill was born and raised in Emporia, Kansas. He earned a Bachelor of Science degree in pharmacy from the University of Kansas.

Career 
Hill served as a medical service officer in the United States Army.

Since 1975, Hill has been an adjunct faculty member of the University of Kansas Pharmacy School. He also worked as a pharmacist for the Medicine Shoppe until he sold the business in 2013.

Hill is a former member of the Kansas Pharmacy Service Corporation and a past President of the Emporia Rotary Club, and previously had been involved with the Emporia Regional Development Association, National Community Pharmacists Association, Emporia Chamber of Commerce, Kansas Pharmacist Association, and the Emporia Arts Council.

On August 1, 2017, it was announced that Hill would serve as the government relations consultant for Emporia State University, though he has retired since then.

References

External links
Kansas Legislature – Don Hill
Project Vote Smart profile
Kansas Votes profile
State Surge – Legislative and voting track record
Campaign contributions: 2002, 2006, 2008

Republican Party members of the Kansas House of Representatives
Living people
1944 births
21st-century American politicians